The Information Security Department (HaMa'arakh LeVithon Meida, abbreviated to Mahbam) is a department in the Israel Defense Forces' Directorate of Military Intelligence, responsible for preventing classified information from being compromised by unauthorized elements. It was formerly known as the Field Security Department.

The Department engages in the study of enemy military intelligence, providing security briefings, securing classified information, and teaching and enforcement activities related to information security. Most of the security breaches that take place are in the area of computing (including the Internet), and the securing of documents. The Department absorbs about 450 new Information Security NCOs annually. Its members serve in all branches of the IDF.

See also
 Information security governance
 Information security management
 Security information management

Military units and formations of Israel
Military intelligence agencies
Israel
National security institutions
Military Intelligence Directorate (Israel)